The 1997 African Cup Winners' Cup football club tournament was won by Étoile Sportive du Sahel in two-legged final victory against FAR Rabat. This was the twenty-third season that the tournament took place for the winners of each African country's domestic cup. Forty-one sides entered the competition. Teams from Niger and the Central African Republic were disqualified because their federations were in debt to CAF. Club 'S' Namakia from Madagascar withdrew before the 1st leg of the preliminary round, Maxaquene from Mozambique withdrew before the 1st leg of the first round while Racing Bafoussam from Cameroon was disqualified for not showing up in time for the 1st leg. The last team to withdraw from the competition was Dragons from Zaire before the 1st leg of the second round.

Jomo Cosmos replaced Orlando Pirates, who were admitted to the Champions League for being the champions of both the league and cup competitions in South Africa.

Preliminary round

|}

Notes
1 Sahel SC and Central African Republic representative club disqualified because their federations were in debt to CAF.

First round

|}

Notes
1 RC Bafoussam were disqualified for not showing up in time for the 1st leg.

Second round

|}

Notes
1 Uganda Electricity Board FC changed it name to Umeme FC.

Quarter-finals

|}

Semi-finals

|}

Final

|}

First leg

Second leg

Champions

External links
 Results available on CAF Official Website
 Results available on RSSSF

African Cup Winners' Cup
2